Canadian singer Diana Krall has released 15 studio albums, one live album, one compilation album, one extended play, four singles, 16 promotional singles, three video albums, and seven music videos. Throughout her career, Krall has won numerous awards and has sold 16 million albums, establishing herself as one of the best-selling artists of her time.

Albums

Studio albums

Live albums

Compilation albums

Extended plays

Singles

Promotional singles

Other charted songs

Guest appearances

Other credits

Videography

Video albums

Music videos

Notes

References

External links
 
 
 
 

Discography
Discographies of Canadian artists
Vocal jazz discographies